Moti Lal Prasad is an Indian politician from Bharatiya Janata Party, Bihar and a two term Member of Bihar Legislative Assembly from Riga Assembly constituency.

References 

1961 births
Living people
Bihar MLAs 2020–2025
Bharatiya Janata Party politicians from Bihar
Bihar MLAs 2010–2015